CE, Ce, ce, or variants may refer to:

Business
 CE marking (stylized ), a mandatory administrative marking asserting conformity with relevant standards, applied certain products offered for sale within the European Economic Area; 
 Customer equity, the total combined customer lifetime values of all of the company's customers
 Combustion Engineering, a former American manufacturer of power systems
 Nationwide Airlines (South Africa) (IATA airline designator CE)

Calendar
 Common Era (abbreviated CE), an alternative term to Anno Domini (AD)

Education
 College English, an official publication of the American National Council of Teachers of English
 Common Entrance Examination, tests used by independent schools in the UK
 Conductive education, an educational system developed for people with motor disorders
 Continuing education, a broad spectrum of post-secondary learning activities and programs
 Chartered engineer (UK), a professional engineer licensed by a professional body (modern abbreviation CEng)
 Hong Kong Certificate of Education Examination, a standardized examination from 1974 to 2011

Entertainment
 cê, a 2006 music album by Caetano Veloso
 Chaotic Evil, an alignment in the tabletop game Dungeons and Dragons
 Collector's edition, describing some special editions of software, movies, and books
 Cash Explosion, Ohio Lottery's scratch off game and weekly game show
Halo: Combat Evolved, sometimes abbreviated as Halo: CE

Job titles
 Chief Executive, administrative head of some regions
 County executive, the head of the executive branch of county government, common in the U.S.
 Construction Electrician (US Navy), a Seabee occupational rating in the U.S. Navy

Languages
 Canadian English
 Chechen language (ISO 639-1 language code: ce)

Organizations
 Church of England, the state church of the U.K. and mother church of the Anglican Communion, also referred to as the C of E
 Command element (United States Marine Corps), headquarters component of U.S. Marine Corps Marine Air-Ground Task Force (MAGTF)
 European Community,

Places
 Cé (Pictish territory), an early medieval Pictish territory in modern-day Scotland
 Province of Caserta (ISO 3166-2:IT code CE), a province of Italy
 County Clare, Ireland (vehicle registration plate code CE)
 Ceará (ISO 3166-2:BR code CE), a state in Brazil
 Ceper railway station, a railway station in Indonesia (station code)
 Lough Key, known in Irish as Loch Cé
 Sri Lanka (FIPS Pub 10-4 and obsolete NATO country code CE)

Science and technology

Computing
 Central European, an alternate name for Windows-1250
 Cheat Engine, a system debugger and cheating tool
 Clear Entry,  a button on a standard electronic calculator that clears the last number entered
 c.e., a common abbreviation for Computably enumerable, a property of some sets in computability theory
 Congestion Experienced, a protocol element of the Explicit Congestion Notification data networking protocol
 Customer edge router, a router at the customer premises that is connected to a Multi-protocol Label Switching network
 Windows CE, a version of the Windows operating system designed for mobile devices

Other uses in science and technology
 Capillary electrophoresis, a technique used to separate ionic species by their charge and frictional forces
 CE phase, the phase between carrier and envelope of an electromagnetic wave
 Cerium, symbol Ce, a chemical element
 Cholesteryl ester
 Civil engineering
 Common envelope, gas containing a binary system.
 Conjugated estrogen
 Consumer electronics
 Customer engineer

Other uses
 Copy editing, improving the formatting, style, and accuracy of text

See also
 Œ (OE ligature)
 ₠ (U-20A0, European Currency Unit) (former)